Gilmàr Fernandez (born 21 January 1994) is a Filipino former professional footballer who played as a winger or striker.

Career

Youth

Millwall
Born in Lewisham, London, Fernandez started his youth career at Millwall.

In 2004, Fernandez had a trial with Spanish giants Barcelona.

Leyton Orient
In 2008, after playing for Millwall's youth team, Fernandez joined the youth team of Leyton Orient.

Dagenham & Redbridge
After playing a single season with Leyton Orient's U16 team, Fernandez received scholarship offers from Crawley Town, Macclesfield Town, Cambridge United before joining the youth team of Dagenham & Redbridge.

Floriana
In 2012, after being released by Dagenham & Redbridge, Fernandez joined Maltese Premier League club Floriana.

In 2013, Coventry City had reportedly made a €20,000 bid for Fernandez but the deal was unable to push through due to the club receiving a transfer embargo in January 2014.

Balzan
In 2013, after playing one season with Floriana, Fernandez joined Maltese Premier League club Balzan.

On 25 April 2014, Fernandez made his debut for Balzan in a 1–3 defeat against Mosta.

Alloa Athletic
In 2015, after his 2-year stint with Balzan, Fernadez joined Scottish Championship club Alloa Athletic.

Fernandez featured for the reserve side of the Wasps.

Loan to Stallion
Months after joining the club, the management of Alloa then allowed Gilmar to join United Football League club Stallion in a 6-month loan with an option of extending for another 6 months.

Dinamo-Auto
In 2016, after being released by Alloa Athletic, Fernandez joined Divizia Națională club Dinamo-Auto.

Davao Aguilas
In 2017, six months after joining Dinamo-Auto, Fernandez joined Philippines Football League club Davao Aguilas.

On 11 May 2017, Fernandez made his debut for Davao in a 1–1 away draw against Ilocos United.

Morecambe
In 2017, after his short stint with Davao Aguilas, Fernandez joined EFL League Two club Morecambe.

Global Cebu
In July 2018, Fernadez returned to the Philippines as he joined Philippines Football League club Global Cebu in a 6-month loan.

In 2019, Fernandez was released by Morecambe and joined Global Cebu on a free transfer.

Bangkok
Fernandez left Global Cebu and joined Thai League 3 club Bangkok.

Return to Global Makati
On 30 January 2020, Fernandez returned to Philippine Football and rejoined Global Makati. He previously joined the club way back 3rd season of the PFL.

International career
Fernandez was born in England to a Jamaican father and a Filipina mother, which made him eligible to represent England, Jamaica and the Philippines at international level.

Philippines U-23
In August 2019, Fernandez was invited to train with the Philippines U-23 in preparation for the 2019 Southeast Asian Games which will be held in the Philippines.

Personal life
Fernandez was born in Lewisham, London, England, the son of former Crystal Palace footballer Rodney Lynch and Filipina Charmainne Johanna Antheà Fernandez.

References

External links

1994 births
Living people
Association football forwards
English people of Filipino descent
Filipino British sportspeople
British Asian footballers
Citizens of the Philippines through descent
English expatriate footballers
English footballers
Jamaican footballers
Filipino footballers